The USRC James Madison was a schooner named for Founding Father James Madison and launched in 1807 at Baltimore for service with the United States Revenue-Marine. During the first months of the War of 1812 she captured several merchant vessels, but in August 1812  captured her. Lord Belmore, of Enniskillen, bought her and converted her to a privateer brig named Osprey. After the end of the Napoleonic Wars and the War of 1812 she became a yacht for a family trip to the eastern Mediterranean. In 1819, at the end of the trip, Bellmore sold her to Ferdinand I, King of Naples; her ultimate fate is unknown.

Revenue cutter
On 26 June 1807, the Treasury Department of the United States authorized the Baltimore customs collector to build the cutter James Madison. She was completed in 1808. James Madison then sailed from Baltimore on 18 January 1809 to Savannah, Georgia, to take up station there.

George Brooks became First mate of James Madison on 17 September 1810, and master on 19 December 1811.

After the outbreak of the War of 1812 in June, on 5 July, James Madison detained the British schooner Wade at Amelia Island, which at that time belonged to Spanish Florida. Wades actual captors were US Navy gunboats and Wade was carrying pineapples, turtles, and 20,000 dollars in specie. Lloyd's List reported that American gunboats in St Mary's River had taken the Wade, Johnson, master, and another vessel, Pindar, master, from Nassau and carrying specie.

Brooks expanded the size of James Madisons crew to some 70 officers and men. He also had them armed, using borrowed funds. The size of her crew was anomalously large for a Revenue Marine vessel, suggesting that Brooks had intended to engage in privateering.

On 17 July 1812 Brooks declared that James Madison would sail from Charleston to intercept
six British merchant vessels reported to be sailing up the coast from Jamaica without a naval escort. Six days later he succeeded in capturing the British brig Shamrock, May, master, of 300 tons bm, six guns, and a crew of 15 men. She had been sailing from London to Amelia Island with a cargo of arms and ammunition. Then on 1 August James Madison captured the brig Santa Rosa. James Madison sent Santa Rosa, which was sailing under Spanish colours, into Savannah.

James Madisons last cruise began on 15 August when she left Savannah in the company of the privateers Paul Jones, Hazard, and Spencer. James Madison separated from the other three and proceeded to sail well beyond her normal area of operations.

Brooks attempted to capture a vessel, but despite reports to the contrary, failed. He dogged the convoy until 22 August when Barbadoes captured James Madison after a seven-hour chase.

Capture
At the time of her capture, James Madison was pierced for 14 guns, carried ten, but had thrown two overboard during the chase. She had a crew of 65 or 70 men. Captain Huskisson, of Barbadoes, reported that she was seven days out of Savannah but had made no captures. He described her as coppered and copper-fastened, two years old, and a remarkably fast sailer.

The British immediately fitted out James Madison for the protection of the fleet. They put two officers and 40 men on board, drawn from Barbadoes and her existing crew. On 26 August a hurricane came up that scattered the vessels of the convoy. It also totally dis-masted Barbadoes and sprung Polyphemuss main and foremasts. On 3 September an American privateer schooner of 14 guns started shadowing James Madison and the vessels she was escorting. During the subsequent four days the privateer stayed close enough to exchange occasional shots with James Madison, but did not succeed in capturing anything. On 3 October Polyphemus and James Madison arrived separately at Portsmouth.

Despite Huskinson's glowing description, the Royal Navy did not take her into service. The Navy surveyed her on 13 October 1812 and found her unfit for British naval service as she was too slight and exhibited some rotten timber.

American aftermath
The British paroled Brooks and his officers and sent them to New York in the cartel brig Diamond, which arrived there on 24 November. Most of the crew ended up prisoners of war in Britain.

On 28 December Secretary of the Treasury Albert Gallatin wrote in response to a letter from the Customs Collector at Boston:

Brook does not appear to have served again as a master on a revenue cutter.

Privateer
Lord Belmore bought James Madison on 16 June 1813 and had her converted from schooner to brig rig. He also renamed her Osprey, with home port of Killybegs in Donegal. Later, Belmore had her armed; her warrant as a letter of marque against the United States named Richard Chambers as master and the size of her crew as 30 men. However, it bore the date 27 August 1814, which ex post was quite late in the war. There is no sign in either the London Gazette or Lloyd's List of Osprey taking any prizes.

Lord Belmore's yacht
Around 1817, Lord Belmore used Osprey for a family cruise to the Eastern Mediterranean. Her captain was Lord Belmore's brother, Captain Armar Lowry-Corry, RN. The party included Belmore's wife, the Countess Juliana, their two sons, their lapdog Rosa, the family doctor, Dr. Robert Richardson, M.D. (Edinburgh), and the vicar, Mr. Holt. They visited Malta, Sicily, Italy, the Ionian Islands, Greece, Rome, and Alexandria. They also sailed up the Nile as far as Luxor in three local boats.

Lord Belmore apparently had two hobbies in Egypt. One hobby was collecting antiquities; the other hobby was carving his name on Egyptian antiquities. After Egypt, the family traveled to Palestine and Jerusalem. In 1819 when the family was done with their cruise, Belmore sold Osprey to the King of Naples and the family returned home.

See also
 USS James Madison (SSBN-627)

Notes, citations, and references
Notes

Citations

References
Lowry-Corry, Somerset Richard, Earl of Belmore (1881) The History of the Two Ulster Manors of Finagh: In the County of Tyrone, and Coole, Otherwise Manor Atkinson, in the County of Fermanagh, and of Their Owners. (Longmans, Green & Company).
Mayes, Stanley (2006) The Great Belzoni: The Circus Strongman Who Discovered Egypt's Ancient Treasures. (Tauris Parke Paperbacks).  
U.S. Coast Guard History Program: War of 1812 Revenue Cutters & Masters. 
Wells, William R., II (1998) "US Revenue Cutters Captured in the War of 1812". American Neptune, Vol. 58, No. 3, pp. 225–241.

Ships of the United States Coast Guard
Ships of the United States Revenue Cutter Service
Privateer ships
Captured ships
1807 ships
Ships named for Founding Fathers of the United States